Iberia is a region of Southwestern Europe including Spain, Portugal and Andorra.

Culture of Iberia may refer to:

Culture of Spain
Culture of Portugal
Culture of Andorra

See also
Culture of Europe
Cultural policies of the European Union